Dempsey and Firpo (sometimes referred to as Dempsey Through The Ropes) is a 1923–1924 oil canvas painting by George Bellows, depicting the September 14, 1923 boxing match between American Jack Dempsey and Argentine Luis Firpo. As time passed by it has become Bellows' most famous boxing painting. The work has been in the collection of the Whitney Museum of Art since the museum's opening in 1931.

The painting 
The painting depicts the dramatic moment when Firpo knocked Dempsey out of the ring, despite the fact that Dempsey was the eventual winner that night. Bellows gave himself a cameo as the balding man at the extreme left of the picture. The work is painted in the style of the Ashcan School movement.

In popular culture 

The painting is referenced in The Simpsons episode "The Homer They Fall" during a montage of Homer Simpson winning boxing matches, where he and Moe Syzlak taking the poses of respectively Firpo and the referee.

The painting can be seen in the 1990 film Goodfellas, where it is visible behind Jimmy Conway on the wall of Neirs Tavern during Tommy DeVito's recount of a mob hit, the scene before Maury is "whacked."

The painting also appears briefly overhead a fireplace in the third episode of The People V. O.J. Simpson.

The fight, that is the subject of the work, is also cited by Mickey Goldmill in the movie "Rocky" during his visit with Rocky in which he attempts to convince Rocky to retain him as his manager.

The New Yorker cover for the February 7, 2022 issue recasts the fighters as hockey players.

Sources

External links 
 Whitney Museum official page about the painting.
 About the work.

1923 paintings
1924 paintings
Boxing in art
Sports paintings
Cultural depictions of Jack Dempsey
Cultural depictions of Argentine men
Cultural depictions of boxers
Paintings by George Bellows
Paintings in the collection of the Whitney Museum of American Art